Nikol Bulat (born 16 October 1987) is a Croatian former singer.

Biography 
Nikol Bulat was born in Šibenik, SR Croatia, Yugoslavia on 16 October 1987. In 2006 she competed for the position of lead singer of Magazin, popular pop music band from Split, after Jelena Rozga had left it. She performed their song "Opijum" (Opium) but she lost to Ivana Kovač.

In 2008 she became a member of Feminnem. With Feminnem, she recorded songs "Chanel 5" (Chanel No. 5), "Poljupci u boji" (Kisses in Colour) and "Oye, Oye, Oye", the latter featuring Spanish singer Alex Manga. Despite much success, she didn't fit in the group and subsequently left it.

In 2009, she released her debut solo single "Grešnica" (Sinner). The year after, she performed a song "Samo mi" (Just Us) at Mediafest. At the beginning of 2011, she recorded a duet "Crveni karton" (Red Card) with Bosnian singer Ada Grahović and, in June, she announced the songs "Strašno ti stojim" (I Suit You Terrifically) and "Hajde opa" (Come On Hopa) as her new singles, produced by Costi Ioniţă.

Personal life 
Nikol holds master's degree in law. According to reports, she left the music business and is working as an attorney as of 2018. She is in a relationship with Croatian football player Ivan Šunjić.

Singles

See also 
 Feminnem

References

1987 births
21st-century Croatian women singers
Living people
Croatian folk-pop singers
People from Šibenik
Croatian lawyers